Crossref (formerly styled CrossRef) is an official digital object identifier (DOI) Registration Agency of the International DOI Foundation. It is run by the Publishers International Linking Association Inc. (PILA) and was launched in early 2000 as a cooperative effort among publishers to enable persistent cross-publisher citation linking in online academic journals. In August 2022, Crossref lists that index more than 60 million journal studies were made free to view and reuse, and they made a challenge publicly to other publishers, to add their reference data to the index.

Background 
Crossref is a nonprofit association of approximately 2,000 voting member publishers who represent 4,300 societies and publishers, including both commercial and nonprofit organizations. Crossref includes publishers with varied business models, including those with both open access and subscription policies. Crossref does not provide a database of fulltext scientific content. Rather, it facilitates the links among distributed content hosted at other sites.

Crossref interlinks millions of items from a variety of content types, including journals, books, conference proceedings, working papers, technical reports, and data sets. Linked content includes materials from scientific, technical, and medical (STM), and social sciences and humanities (SSH) disciplines. The expense is paid for by Crossref member publishers. Crossref provides the technical and business infrastructure to provide for this reference linking using digital object identifiers (DOIs). Crossref provides deposit and query service for its DOIs.

In addition to the DOI technology linking scholarly references, Crossref enables a common linking contract among its participants. Members agree to assign DOIs to their current journal content and they also agree to link from the references of their content to the content of other publishers. This reciprocity is an important component of what makes the system work.

Non-publisher organizations may participate in Crossref by becoming affiliates. Such organizations include libraries, online journal hosts, linking service providers, secondary database providers, search engines, and providers of article discovery tools.

Services 
In addition to assigning DOIs to scholarly content, Crossref provides additional services such as plagiarism screening and searching by funders.

CrossMark 

The CrossMark update system facilitates reference linking and other sustainable cross-publisher services for the scholarly community. The reader simply clicks on the CrossMark logo to view status information about the document. If an update exists, the status information will include a DOI link to the updated document.

Initiative for Open Citations 

Crossref citation data is made available on behalf of the Initiative for Open Citations, a project, launched in April 2017, that describes itself as "a collaboration between scholarly publishers, researchers, and other interested parties to promote the unrestricted availability of scholarly citation data".

Awards 
In September 2012, Crossref was awarded the Association of Learned and Professional Society Publishers (ALPSP) Award for Contribution to Scholarly Publishing. According to ALPSP, "With over 4,000 participating publishers, Crossref’s reach is international and it is very well regarded not just amongst publishers, but also the literary community and researchers. Crossref has built on this unique position to offer other services such as Crossref Cited by Linking, CrossCheck, CrossMark and the latest project, FundRef. Crossref’s services provide solutions that are best done collectively by the industry to improve scholarly communications."

The Council of Science Editors (CSE) awarded Crossref its Award for Meritorious Achievement at the CSE annual meeting in May 2009. This was only the second time the award had been presented to an organization rather than to an individual.

In September 2008, ALPSP awarded Crossref its Innovation in Publishing award for the CrossCheck plagiarism screening service powered by iThenticate.

References

External links 

 
 Crossref Blog

Academic publishing
Organizations established in 2000
Publishing organizations
Publishing-related professional associations